Ondřej Macl (born 1989) is a Czech poet and actor. He studies acting at DAMU, the Academy of Performing Arts in Prague in the Faculty of Theatre. He graduated in comparative literature at Charles University in Prague, had a six-month internship at Paris-Sorbonne IV, and studied social work and journalism at the Masaryk University in Brno. He won the Jiří Orten Award in 2018 for his debut book of poetry, Miluji svou babičku víc než mladé dívky.

Awards 
 2018 Jiří Orten Award

References

External links 
 Ondřej Macl personal website

Living people
1989 births
Czech poets
Charles University alumni